School Aycliffe is a village in County Durham, England. It is a short distance west of Newton Aycliffe, and east of Heighington. Its name derives from a Viking called Scula, who owned land in that part of South Durham.

School Aycliffe is split into two by School Aycliffe Lane. On the north side is the original village. It is under the remit of Durham County Council (between 1974 and 2009, it was part of the borough of Sedgefield), and part of the parish of Great Aycliffe. The School Aycliffe Wetlands is a wildlife habitat situated on the northern edge of the village.

On the southern side is a new housing estate, "The Chestnuts", under the remit of the Borough of Darlington and part of the parish of Heighington. The now-closed Aycliffe Hospital, a mental health facility, was located there before the estate was built. The father of comedian, writer and actor Mark Gatiss worked at the hospital, and it became the inspiration for a number of ideas used by Gatiss in the TV show The League Of Gentlemen.

References

External links

Villages in County Durham
Heighington, County Durham